Til the Morning is the twelfth studio album by American singer Keith Sweat. It was released by KDS Entertainment and eOne Music on November 8, 2011 in the United States.

Critical reception

Allmusic editor Andy Kellman wrote that "Sweat is once again assisted by so many (sometimes credited) background singers that one can drop into the album at various points, listen for a few seconds, and hear nothing but other voices. The occasionally pleasing album is mostly slow jam territory with functional and tasteful productions that are sometimes enhanced with low-key synthesizer work."

Track listing

Personnel
Credits for Til the Morning adapted from Allmusic.

 Adam Ledgister – instruments
 Adrian Albritton – photography
 Gazelle Alexander – promoter
 Antoine Tatum – vocals (background)
 Luke Austin – composer, Producer
 Dave Benck – engineer
 Robert Brent – composer
 Mike Chaser – composer
 Karlyton "K.K. " Clanton – composer, producer
 Adam Clinton – composer
 Shawnte Crespo – product Manager
 Tony Deangelo Criswell – composer
 Bill Crowley – promoter
 Chip Days Jr. – composer, Vocals (background)
 Latonya Debouch – composer
 Marleny Dominguez – executive Vice President
 Angelo Durham – composer, instruments, vocals (background)
 Dave Evans – keyboards, mixing
 Young Fyre – producer
 Adam Gibbs – composer
 Johnny Gill – featured artist
 Jon Gordon – composer
 Michael Aaron Gordon – composer
 Paul Grosso – creative director, design
 Chris Herche – marketing
 Halley Hiatt – assistant

 Rochad Holiday – composer, producer
 Folondo Johnson – composer
 Rolando Johnson – composer
 Gerald Levert – featured artist
 Billy Ray Little – composer
 Marlon McClain – composer, producer
 Giovanna Melchiorre – publicity
 Christopher Newland – composer
 Bob Perry – A&R
 The Platinum Brothers – programming, producer
 Herb Powers – mastering
 Deborah Rigaud – legal dvisor
 Sean Rock – promoter
 Steve Russell – composer, producer, instruments, Vocals (background)
 Olga Santana – engineer, mixing assistant
 Alvin Speights – mixing
 Shadow Stokes – promoter
 Keith Sweat – composer, producer, vocals (background)
 T–Pain – composer, featured artist
 Dontay Thompson – promoter
 Javier Valverde – engineer, mixing
 Lasasha Monet Van – composer
 Courtney Vantrease – composer
 Maurice White – promoter
 Tramaine Winfrey – composer
 Andrew Wright – mixing assistant

Charts

References 

2011 albums
Keith Sweat albums